In the run-up to the next Croatian parliamentary election, various organisations have been carrying out monthly opinion polling to gauge voting intention in Croatia. Results of such polls are displayed in this article. The date range is from after the previous parliamentary election, held on 5 July 2020, to the present day.

Polling average

Graph 
The following graph depicts the evolution of standings of the two main political parties and three other parties in the poll average since last parliamentary elections.

Table

Party standings 
Surveys in Croatia are conducted by specialized companies in the field of public opinion polls, and their results are published in cooperation with national television or newspapers. The media that publish the results are listed in the table below according to which TV show they publish the results, with which poll company they cooperate, the size of the poll, the number of polls conducted so far and the time of publication of the results.

Poll results published by major media are listed in the table below in reverse chronological order, showing the most recent first, and using the date of publication, name of polling firm with a link to the page of results and poll size. The highest percentage figure in each polling survey is displayed in bold, and the background shaded in the leading party's color. In the instance that there is a tie, then all tied parties cells would be shaded. The lead column on the right shows the percentage-point difference between the two parties with the highest figures. When a specific poll does not show a data figure for a party or the support percentage is less than 1.0%, the party's cell corresponding to that poll is shown with a dash. Table also include other elections that are held between two parliamentary elections.

Notes

Reference 

Opinion polling in Croatia
Croatia